Gabriel Vitorio da Silva (born 18 September 1987), sometimes known as just Gabriel, is a Brazilian football defender.

Career

DAC Dunajská Streda
He came to DAC in autumn 2013, from Czech FC Vysočina Jihlava. He made his debut for FK DAC 1904 Dunajská Streda in a Corgoň Liga match against MFK Košice on September 14, 2013.

Carolina RailHawks
On 28 August 2015, Gabriel da Silva signed for Carolina RailHawks until the end of the 2015 season.

References

External links
FC Vysočina Jihlava Profile

1987 births
Living people
Brazilian footballers
Association football defenders
Esporte Clube Taubaté players
Esporte Clube Vitória players
FC Vysočina Jihlava players
FC DAC 1904 Dunajská Streda players
North Carolina FC players
Czech First League players
Slovak Super Liga players
North American Soccer League players
Brazilian expatriate footballers
Expatriate footballers in Burkina Faso
Expatriate footballers in the Czech Republic
Expatriate footballers in Slovakia
Expatriate soccer players in the United States
Brazilian expatriate sportspeople in the Czech Republic
Brazilian expatriate sportspeople in Slovakia
Brazilian expatriate sportspeople in the United States
Brazilian expatriates in Burkina Faso
People from Itanhaém